Jazz, dwa, trzy (English: Jazz, Two, Three (Jazz is pronounced similar to "raz", which means when counting "one")) is an album released by Polish rapper O.S.T.R. on February 22, 2011.

Track listing

Charts and certifications

Charts

Certifications

References

2011 albums
O.S.T.R. albums
Polish-language albums